South Dakota Highway 377 (SD 377) is a  state highway in Jackson County, South Dakota, United States. It begins at an intersection with SD 44 in Interior, and travels in a northeasterly direction to its northern terminus at the Interior Entrance Station for Badlands National Park.



Route description
SD 377 begins at an intersection with SD 44 in the northeastern part of Interior. It is a near-straight two-lane highway for its entire length. It ends at the Interior Entrance Station for Badlands National Park.

Major intersections

See also

 List of state highways in South Dakota

References

External links

 South Dakota Highways Page: Highways 201 +

377
Transportation in Jackson County, South Dakota